A Sword from Red Ice is the third book in the Sword of Shadows fantasy series by J. V. Jones. The first two books in the series are A Cavern of Black Ice and A Fortress of Grey Ice.  It was published in the United States and the United Kingdom on October 16, 2007.

Plot summary
From OCLC Worldcat's summary, "As Ash March pursues her destiny with the legendary Sull people, Raif Sevrance seeks a place where he belongs, in a tale set in the wake of deadly clan battles and a darker force from an evil city that threatens their world."

The prologue can be read online.

References 

British fantasy novels
2007 British novels
Orbit Books books